Gununa, sometimes spelt Gunana, is a rural town on Mornington Island within the locality of Wellesley Islands in the Shire of Mornington, Queensland, Australia.

Geography 
Gununa is located on the southwestern end of Mornington Island, on the Gulf of Carpentaria. The town faces the Appel Channel, on the other side of which is Denham Island.

History 
The town was founded in 1914 as Mornington Island Community, and renamed by the Queensland Place Names Board on 16 January 1982. Gunana or Gununa is a Lardil word.

Mornington Island State School opened on 28 January 1975.

Gununa Post Office was open by 1982.

Education 
Mornington Island State School is a government-run primary and secondary school for boys and girls from early childhood through Year 10. It is located at Lardil Street. In 2018, the school had an enrolment of 263 students, with 25 teachers and 14 part-time and full-time non-teaching staff (the equivalently of 11 full-time employees). It includes a special education program.

There are no schools offering education to Year 12 on the island; nor are there any nearby. Distance education or boarding school are the only options for education past Year 10.

Amenities 
Gununa Post Office is in Mukukiya Street.

Mornington Island Uniting Church is at  21 Dajibuka Street. It is part of the Calvary Presbytery of the Uniting Church in Australia.

References 

Shire of Mornington (Queensland)
Towns in Queensland